The D.C. Water Main Pumping Station (or simply Main Pumping Station) is located at 125 O Street, SE in the Southeast Quadrant of Washington, D.C. on the Anacostia River between the Washington Navy Yard and Nationals Park.

History
The Main Sewage Pumping Station is a historic two-and-a-half-story brick building built 1904–1907 in the Beaux Arts style with Renaissance Revival features. Local architect Clement A. Didden designed the building. The exterior is of reddish-brown brick with stone decoration, and the structure is formed of steel and concrete. It was influenced by the City Beautiful Movement of city-planning popular in the early 20th century.

The building was listed in the National Register of Historic Places on May 24, 2012.

Current operation
The District of Columbia Water and Sewer Authority (DC Water) continues to operate the sewage pumping station and it is staffed continuously throughout the year.

References

Sewage pumping stations
Buildings of the United States government in Washington, D.C.
Infrastructure completed in 1907
Sewerage infrastructure on the National Register of Historic Places
Industrial buildings and structures on the National Register of Historic Places in Washington, D.C.
Beaux-Arts architecture in Washington, D.C.
Renaissance Revival architecture in Washington, D.C.
Sewerage infrastructure in the United States
Anacostia River